Daubenton may refer to:
Edme-Louis Daubenton (1730–1785), French naturalist
Louis-Jean-Marie Daubenton (1716–1799), French naturalist
Censier – Daubenton, Paris metro station, named in honour of Louis-Jean-Marie Daubenton
Daubenton's bat (Myotis daubentonii), Eurasian bat, named in honour of Louis-Jean-Marie Daubenton
Daubenton's free-tailed bat (Myopterus daubentonii), African bat, named in honour of Louis-Jean-Marie Daubenton
Marcel-Ambroise d’Aubenton (1742—1782), French Navy officer of the War of American Independence